Phillip Campbell is the former head coach of the women's tennis program at Louisiana State University. Campbell succeeded Betty Sue Hagerman in 1984 and recorded an overall record of 79–49 in five seasons as head coach of the Lady Tigers. He was succeeded by Geoff Macdonald.

References

American tennis coaches
LSU Lady Tigers tennis coaches
Living people
Year of birth missing (living people)